Divyadharsanam is a 1973 Indian Malayalam-language film, directed by J. Sasikumar. The film stars Bahadoor, Sankaradi, Thikkurissy Sukumaran Nair and Adoor Bhasi. The film had musical score by M. S. Viswanathan.

Cast

Bahadoor
Sankaradi
Thikkurissy Sukumaran Nair
Adoor Bhasi
Kaviyoor Ponnamma
Jayabharathi
Madhu
K. P. Ummer
S. P. Pillai
Pattom Sadan
Adoor Bhavani
Sreelatha Namboothiri

Soundtrack

The music was composed by M. S. Viswanathan and the lyrics were written by Sreekumaran Thampi, Thunchathezhuthachan and Kunjan Nambiar.

References

External links
 

1973 films
1970s Malayalam-language films
Films directed by J. Sasikumar